Ron Martin may refer to:

Ron Martin (footballer) (1904–1984), Australian rules footballer
 Ron Martin (artist) (born 1943), Canadian painter
 Ron Martin (geographer) (born 1948), British geographer
Ron Martin (businessman) (born 1953), British businessman and chairman of Southend United Football Club

See also
Ronnie Martin (Joy Electric)
Ronnie Martin (ice hockey)
Ronald Martin (disambiguation)